Rodrigo Muniz Carvalho (born 4 May 2001) is a Brazilian footballer who plays as a forward for Middlesbrough, on loan from Fulham.

Career

Early life
Born in São Domingos do Prata, Muniz started his career with Desportivo Brasil, who he played for between 2016 and 2018.

Flamengo

Coritiba (loan)
On 13 October 2020 Muniz moved to Coritiba on loan until the end of the 2020 season. But after only six appearances and one goal for Coritiba he was asked to return to Flamengo.

Fulham
On 13 August 2021, Muniz traveled to Spain for a fourteen day quarantine before going to England to sign with Fulham. On the same day Flamengo and Fulham reached an agreement for a €8m transfer fee with the Brazilian club keeping 20% of a future transfer. Both clubs officially announced the transfer on 20 August. He scored his first goal for Fulham in a 2–1 loss to Reading on 18 September.

On 21 August 2022, Muniz signed for Championship club Middlesbrough on a season-long loan. He scored his first goal for the club in a 2–1 loss against Watford on 30 August.

Career statistics

Club

Honours
Flamengo
Campeonato Brasileiro Série A: 2020
Supercopa do Brasil: 2021
Campeonato Carioca: 2021

Fulham
EFL Championship: 2021–22

References

2001 births
Living people
Brazilian footballers
Association football forwards
Desportivo Brasil players
CR Flamengo footballers
Coritiba Foot Ball Club players
Fulham F.C. players
Campeonato Brasileiro Série A players
English Football League players
Brazilian expatriate footballers
Expatriate footballers in England
Brazilian expatriate sportspeople in England
Middlesbrough F.C. players